Tracer is the name of two fictional supervillains published by DC Comics. He first appeared in Justice League Europe #16 (July 1990), and was created by Keith Giffen, Gerard Jones and Bart Sears. Like the rest of the Extremists, he is based on a Marvel Comics villain, in his case Victor Creed/Sabretooth, an arch-enemy of Wolverine.

Fictional character biography

Tracer
The first Tracer was a supervillain on the world of Angor, an otherdimensional duplicate of Earth. The Extremists wiped out Angor in a nuclear explosion, leaving only themselves and a few heroes who fled to Earth. The Extremists pursued them and it was revealed that all but one of them had died and the surviving one, Dreamslayer, used androids of his comrades, including Tracer. They were deactivated and stored in the Watchtower. Tracer and his android duplicate demonstrated enhanced senses that made him an excellent tracker, enhanced strength and reflexes, a feral attitude, razor sharp claws, and enhanced healing.

Tracer Robot
The second Tracer was a robotic duplicate of the first Tracer, one of many robots created by the inventor Mitch Wacky on the otherdimensional world of Angor, as part of a theme park attraction. After the death of virtually all heroes and villains on the planet, the evil Dreamslayer used the robot duplicates to re-create his villain team, the Extremists. After traveling to Earth, the Extremists almost took over the world before being defeated by Justice League Europe. The Extremists robots were then exhibited in Madame Clouseau's Wax Museum in Paris. They were later used by Dreamslayer a second time on the island of Kooey Kooey Kooey, and still later as pawns of Twilight in a battle with Supergirl. The Tracer robot had all the powers of the original Tracer which included great strength, speed, and agility, enhanced senses and animal instincts.

Countdown
In the Countdown to Final Crisis tie-in series Lord Havok and the Extremists, a variant version resides on Earth-8. Originally a soldier who was badly injured trying to desert his post, Vincent Cade's broken body was experimented on by the government. Cade was given enhanced strength, speed and senses. He was also forced to endure hours of violent images and subliminal audio telling him to kill. He was implanted with a chip to be controlled with, but Tracer's first mission ended with him trying to kill one of his own teammates. Just as his masters were about to use the chip to shut him down, Lord Havok arrived, removed the chip, and offered Tracer a place in his organisation. At Havok's command, Tracer works as an assassin-for-hire for government officials, gaining valuable information on them for his master. In #3, he was attacked and badly beaten by Monarch's forces. Team member Bizarra was eventually able to get Tracer strung up by the neck with her lasso. Only Tracer's enhanced healing ability kept him from dying.

Powers and abilities
Tracer has superhuman strength and speed, claws, healing factor, agility, enhanced senses, and animal instincts. He also carries wears a set of wrist blades.

In other media
Tracer makes minor non-speaking appearances in Justice League Unlimited.

References

External links
Cosmic Teams: The Extremists
DCU Guide: Tracer I 
DCU Guide: Tracer II

DC Comics characters with accelerated healing
DC Comics characters with superhuman strength
DC Comics supervillains
Comics characters introduced in 1990
Characters created by Keith Giffen